Rhagium phrygium is a species of beetle in the family Cerambycidae. It was described by Daniel in 1906.

References

Lepturinae
Beetles described in 1906